BC Shumen is a Bulgarian professional basketball club based in Shumen. The club was founded in 1950 and had been playing in lower divisions of Bulgarian basketball system. From 1986 to 2002, the team played in the first basketball league of Bulgaria (NBL). For four consecutive years BC Shumen were second in the regular season, third place three times and also one fourth place in the Bulgarian Basketball Cup. For three seasons BC Shumen took part in the international competition called FIBA Korać Cup. 

The club returned to the top tier division NBL in the 2021–22 season.

Honours 

 NBL
 Third place (2): 1998,1999 
Bulgarian Cup
Bronze medalist (1): 1999

References

External links 

 Official website 
 Club Profile at the Bulgarian basketball federation
 Club Profile at bgbasket.com 
 Eurobasket.com BC Shumen Page

Basketball teams in Bulgaria
Sport in Shumen